The Humboldt River Bridge is a concrete arch bridge across the Humboldt River in Winnemucca, Nevada, United States, that was built in 1910. It is significant as one of the last pair of such bridges surviving in Nevada, and also for association with economic expansion of Winnemucca in the early 20th century.

It was designed by engineer George S. Nickerson.

The bridge was listed on the National Register of Historic Places in 1995.

References

External links

Humboldt River
Winnemucca, Nevada
Bridges completed in 1910
Road bridges on the National Register of Historic Places in Nevada
Buildings and structures in Humboldt County, Nevada
National Register of Historic Places in Humboldt County, Nevada
Concrete bridges in the United States
Arch bridges in the United States